Desmond Clinton Pringle (born April 22, 1970) is an American gospel musician. He started his music career, in 2000, and his first studio album released in 2001. He has released three albums with all of them charting on the Billboard magazine Gospel Albums chart. He has released albums with only three labels, and those are Tommy Boy Records, Central South Music, and Kingdom Records.

Early life
Pringle was born Desmond Clinton Pringle, on April 22, 1970, in Charleston, South Carolina, and his parents were of the Reformed Episcopal church, which was where he was christened as a baby. He attended, Winthrop University He would relocate to Chicago, Illinois, after touring was over. He was mentored by T. D. Jakes and Clay Evans, during his formative songwriting days.

Music career
His solo recording career began in 1999, with the self-released project, but his first major deal was not released until 2001. He released, Loyalty, with Tommy Boy Records on January 16, 2001, and this charted on five Billboard magazine charts. His second album, Be Still, released on September 26, 2006 by Central South Music, only charted on the Billboard Gospel Albums chart; likewise, the third album, Fidelity, released on May 14, 2013 by Kingdom Records, only placed on the aforementioned chart.

Discography

References

External links
 Official website
 Desmond Pringle Cross Rhythms Artist Profile

1970 births
Living people
African-American songwriters
African-American Christians
Musicians from Chicago
Musicians from South Carolina
Songwriters from Illinois
Songwriters from South Carolina
21st-century African-American people
20th-century African-American people